Bunochelis is a genus of harvestmen in the family Phalangiidae.

Species
 Bunochelis canariana (Strand, 1911)
 Bunochelis spinifera (Simon, 1878)

References

Harvestmen
Arachnid genera